Delphian can refer to:
 Delphi, an ancient Greek sanctuary and home of a well-known oracle
 Delphian, one of the ancient Greek dialects
 Delphian (band), a Dutch progressive metal band
 Delphian (typeface)
 Delphian League, an English amateur football league
 Delphian Records, a record label based in Edinburgh, Scotland
 The Delphian School, the founding school of Delphi Schools
 The Delphian Society, founded in 1910 to promote the education of women in the United States 
 The Delphian Club, an early American literary club active between 1816 and 1825

See also
Delphine (disambiguation)